The Paso del Norte International Bridge is an international bridge which crosses the Rio Grande (Río Bravo) connecting the United States-Mexico border cities of El Paso, Texas, and Ciudad Juárez, Chihuahua. The bridge is also known as "Paso del Norte Bridge", "Santa Fe Street Bridge", "Puente Benito Juárez", "Puente Paso del Norte" and "Puente Juárez-Santa Fe". The Paso del Norte International Bridge is a four-lane bridge for northbound non-commercial traffic only. The bridge was constructed in 1967. The American side of the bridge is owned and operated by the City of El Paso.

On March 26, 2019, dozens of illegal immigrants were captured by United States Customs and Border Protection agents, who had insufficient space for them in local holding facilities. So they erected chainlink fencing and concertina wire under the bridge to construct a "transitional shelter" to detain them. As of March 30, hundreds of immigrants were sleeping on dirt and rocks, with mylar blankets, portable toilets and plastic portable sinks.

By mid-June, conditions had worsened, with between 100 and 150 detainees reporting most have been held for over a month, without being allowed to bathe or change clothing, in temperatures exceeding .

Border crossing

The El Paso Paso del Norte (PDN) Port of Entry is among the United States' busiest border crossings.  More than 10 million people enter the US from Mexico each year at this location.  Upon arrival, the admissibility of each person is determined by an officer of Customs and Border Protection (CBP).  Frequently the vehicle and/or possessions of those entering the US are inspected by CBP in an effort to prevent contraband from being brought into the US.

References

International bridges in Texas
International bridges in Chihuahua (state)
Toll bridges in Texas
Bridges completed in 1998
Buildings and structures in El Paso, Texas
Transportation in El Paso, Texas
Road bridges in Texas
Toll bridges in Mexico
Transportation buildings and structures in El Paso County, Texas